The All Golds could mean;

Rugby league
The touring party of New Zealand players in the 1907–08 New Zealand rugby tour of Australia and Great Britain
The New Zealand national rugby league team itself
The 2007 All Golds Tour in celebration of the original tour
University of Gloucestershire All-Golds, an English rugby league side

Chocolate
 Terry's All Gold